Amazonius is a genus of tarantulas first described by Cifuentes & Bertani in 2022. They are found in Venezuela, Colombia, Peru, Ecuador, Brazil and French Guiana. Two of the four species were originally from the Tapinauchenius genus, being A. burgessi, A. elenae.

Species 
 it contains 4 species:

 Amazonius burgessi (Hüsser, 2018) - Venezuela, Colombia and Peru
 Amazonius elenae (Schmidt, 1994) (Type) - Ecuador and Brazil
 Amazonius germani Cifuentes & Bertani, 2022 - French Guiana and Brazil
 Amazonius giovaninii Cifuentes & Bertani, 2022  - Brazil

References 

Theraphosidae
Spiders of South America
Theraphosidae genera
Taxa described in 2022